Canas is a municipality in the state of São Paulo in Brazil. It is part of the Metropolitan Region of Vale do Paraíba e Litoral Norte. The population is 5,204 (2020 est.) in an area of 53.26 km². The elevation is 530 m.

References

Municipalities in São Paulo (state)